Costa Chekrezi (31 March 1892 – 10 January 1959), also known as Constantin Anastas Chekrezi was an Albanian patriot, historian, and publicist.

Biography
Chekrezi was born on 31 March 1892 in Ziçisht village, in the Upper Devoll region located near Korça (back then Ottoman Empire, now Albania).
After finishing a 5-year school in his native village, he finished the Greek high school in the town of Korça on June 12, 1910.  The school documents show he was awarded as "excellent student in all subjects", and earned a scholarship from the Ottoman government to attend (where he stayed for a year only till 1912) the law school in Thessaloniki, now Greece. The studies were interrupted by the start of the First World War. After the Albanian Declaration of Independence until 1914 Chekrezi lived in Vlorë where he worked as a secretary in the Civil Court of the town, later as an interpreter for the International Control Commission assigned near Ismail Qemali's government and later Prince Wied.

When World War I started, Chekrezi emigrated to the US via Italy. Despite his young in age, only 23 years old, Costa Chekrezi became editor of the newspaper "The Sun", in Boston and was chief editor of the newspaper from 1915 to 1919. He also published monthly magazine Illyria, and gave a huge contribution to the Vatra's monthly publication The Adriatic Review, where he emphasized the atrocities over Albanians during World War I. Meanwhile, besides being a polyglot, he studied economics, public administration and English language at Harvard University. He graduated at 17 June 1918, with a Bachelor of Arts degree.
Constantine has also translated into Albanian, a short history of Albania, written by Frederick Gibert, which was published in Boston, and wrote a historical study named "Albania, past and present", published in 1919 in New York City which was translated and published in Albania only in 2012 during the 100th anniversary of Declaration of Independence.

For a period of two years, he has been a professor of history at Columbia University. According to Elsie he briefly returned to Albania in 1920 to participate in the Congress of Lushnje. In the years 1922–1932, has been the accredited representative of the Albanian Government (coming out of the Congress of Lushnje), with the title "Albanian Commissioner in Washington", also a member of the National Press Club in the U.S. In 1923, his English-Albanian dictionary came out.

After returning in Albania in 1925, he would come in sharp conflict with King Zog, specifically to some concessions made in favor of the Italian-Albanian banks newly positioned as part of Zog's affiliation with Italy. Since the first meeting with Ahmet Zagolli, he criticized Albanian political relations with Belgrade as well. In 1929, he served as member of the first Council of State, established on April 11 of that year. The following years will show him as an impressive publicist, editor of the newspapers Telegraf ("Telegraph")  and Ora ("Watch"), where he was pushed to publish some pro-monarchy articles, but immediately after the announcement of the monarchy, Costa Chekrezi was arrested by direct orders of  Koço Kota and sentenced to one year imprisonment. His newspapers, "Telegraf" and "Ora" were shut down forever.

After being an active leader and participant of the Fier Revolt of 1935, he had to flee Albania towards Italy together with his friends Musa Kranja and Xhevahir Arapi on an Italian fishing boat. They reached Monopoli and were transferred to a prison in Bari for three month. There Chekrezi would write to Mussolini asking for his release. After three months they were released and gained the right of Political Asylum. Meanwhile, in Albania, he was sentenced to death in abstention. While trying to form the Organization of Albanian Emigrants, Chekrezi was arrested by the French government and surprisingly placed into the concentration camp of Vernet d' Ariege in France until 27 October 1941. It is not very clear why he was placed there and how he escaped from it. After that, he left for America.

It was 28 December 1941 when Chekrezi together with Tajar Zavalani formed in Boston "Free Albania" organization trying to act like an Albanian Government in Exile, possibly with established connections with Office of Strategic Services, and similarly to what Vatra somehow had functioned during the World War I. He gave up this organization in 1945.
Costa Chekrezi has made efforts to maintain bridges between the Allies and Albania. In 1946, he was the one to receive a delegation headed by Tuk Jakova in New Yorker Hotel, and the second meeting with Mihal Prifti, where Costa suggested that the Albanian government should find the way to connect with the Western powers, especially USA, and abolish the "friendly" relations with Yugoslavia of Tito, drawing parallels with King Zog-Nikola Pašić agreements. In the autumn of 1950, he hosted a meeting with Albanian representatives Behar Shtylla and Vilson Progri at the Governor Clinton Hotel.

In 1951, he published the political analysis "The third plan for partitioning Albania" in Washington D.C.

Constantin Chekrezi, was overshadowed for half a century by the communist regime; he died near Boston, on January 10, 1959, at the age of 66. At his funeral, Fan Noli would describe him as a "statesman, who had struggled all his life for his nation, and a great Albanian guy who had to die poor".

Work
 Letra shkresa fialetore ("Literary letters and writings") (1917), Boston
 Albania and the Balkans (1917),
 Albania past and present (1919), New York : The Macmillan company
 Këndime për rjeshten e funtme te shkollave filltare ("Reading, for the last grade of elementary schools") (1921), Boston
 Histori e Shqipërisë ("History of Albania") (1921), Boston
 Histori e vjetër që në kohërat e Pellazgëve gjer në rrënien e Perandorisë Romane ("Ancient history from the Pelasgian times till the fall of Roman Empire") (1921), Boston
 Histori e re e Evropës ("New European history") (1921), Boston
 Historia mesjetare e Evropës që në rënien e Romës gjer në rënien e Kostantinopojës ("Medieval history of Europe from the fall of Rome till the fall of Constantinople") (478-1453) (1921), Boston 1921
 Chekrezi's English-Albanian dictionary (1923), Boston
 The third plan for partitioning Albania (1951), Washington D.C.

See also
Albanian Kingdom
Albanian Subversion
List of Albanian Americans
Vatra, the Pan-Albanian Federation of America

References

External links
VATRA's Official Website
"Dielli" Albanian-American newspaper

20th-century Albanian historians
Albanian translators
French–Albanian translators
English–Albanian translators
1892 births
1959 deaths
People from Devoll (municipality)
People from Manastir vilayet
Albanians from the Ottoman Empire
Albanian emigrants to the United States
Harvard University alumni
20th-century translators
Albanian publishers (people)
20th-century Albanian politicians
Albanian diplomats
Columbia University faculty